The Municipality of Ruše is a municipality in northeastern Slovenia. The seat of the municipality is the town of Ruše. It lies on the right bank of the Drava River west of Maribor and extends south into the Pohorje Hills. The area is part of the traditional region of Styria. It is now included in the Drava Statistical Region.

Settlements
In addition to the municipal seat of Ruše, the municipality also includes the following settlements:
 Bezena
 Bistrica ob Dravi
 Fala
 Lobnica
 Log
 Smolnik

References

External links
 
 Municipality of Ruše on Geopedia
 Municipality of Ruše website

 
Municipalities of Slovenia
Cities and towns in Styria (Slovenia)
1998 establishments in Slovenia